The Guamaní River is a river of Guayama, Puerto Rico. In 1928, the Public Works department of Puerto Rico spent approximately $183,000 on a risk mitigation project at Guamaní River. There is a 30-meter truss bridge over the Guamaní River in Guayama, which was built in 1936, under a Franklin D. Roosevelt New Deal program.

See also
Cayey Bridge: river crossing on the NRHP
List of rivers of Puerto Rico

References

External links
 USGS Hydrologic Unit Map – Caribbean Region (1974)
 Rios de Puerto Rico

Rivers of Puerto Rico
Guayama, Puerto Rico